The Indian Fantail is a breed of fancy pigeon developed over many years of selective breeding. Indian Fantails, along with other varieties of domesticated pigeons are all descendants of the rock dove (Columba livia).

Description

The Indian Fantail pigeon is a breed of fancy pigeon; it originated in India.

They have a distinct fan shaped tail, and are bigger than the English Fantail pigeon. Indian Fantail pigeons are most commonly white with light tan spots, although breeders have introduced more new colours. Their feet are covered in feathers, and the birds walk on their toes. Their average weight is 13 ounces (369 g) and their average length is 11 inches (28 cm). The Indian fantail stands upright, unlike the english fantail whose chest is carried upright so that it is higher than the bird's head, which rests back on the cushion formed by the tail feathers.

Indian Fantail pigeons usually lay 2 or 3 eggs in a clutch. Hatched fledglings take at least 4 to 6 weeks to fly and leave their home. Usually a breeding pair can lay eggs around or after 21 days from the first hatch.

See also 
List of pigeon breeds

References

Pigeon breeds